The term "Literati purges" is a translation of the Korean term 'sahwa', whose literal meaning is "scholars' calamity". It refers to a series of political purges in the late 15th and 16th centuries, in which Sarim scholars suffered persecution at the hands of their political rivals.

The politics of the Middle Joseon Dynasty were primarily marked by a power struggle between two social groups among the yangban aristocracy. People in place were the 'Meritorious Subjects', rewarded for helping the establishment of Joseon against the former Goryeo, and subsequent accomplishments. Referred as the Hungu faction (Hungupa, 훈구파, 勳舊派),  they held the key positions in the State Council and the Six Ministries that carried out state affairs. The newcomers were the so-called Sarim (Sarimpa, 사림파, 士林派), who belonged to the neo-Confucian school of Kim Jong-jik and other thinkers. The Sarim scholars generally shunned the royal court and studied neo-Confucianism in rural provinces, especially after King Sejo's usurpation of the throne in 1455. 

During the reign of King Seongjong, Sarim scholars started to occupy key positions in what was known as the "Three Offices" (Samsa, 삼사), the collective name for three government watchdog organizations: the Office of Inspector General (Saheonbu, 사헌부, 司憲府), whose main role was to impeach government officials for corrupt or improper actions; the Office of Censors (Saganwon, 사간원, 司諫院), whose function to criticize the improper actions and policies of the king and ministers; and the Office of Special Advisors (Hongmungwan, 홍문관, 弘文館) who oversaw the royal library and served as research institute to study Confucian philosophy and answer the king's questions.

Using the Samsa as a stronghold, the Sarim scholars challenged the power of the central government and the Hungu faction as a whole, impeaching them for alleged corruption or impropriety. The subsequent conflict between these two factions resulted in violent purges (1498, 1504, 1519, 1545), having a specific pattern among the political purges that occurred in Joseon from 1453 to 1722 (whose traditional number is twelve for the period 1453-1722). 

While the Sarim faction lost each of the four confrontations, their moral influence continued to increase and finally they eclipsed the former Hungu faction.

First literati purge of 1498
The first and second literati purges took place during the reign of Yeonsangun, successor to Seongjong. The First Literati Purge of 1498, also called Muo Sahwa (무오사화, 戊午士禍/戊午史禍), began as the personal grudge of Yi Guk-don against Kim Il-son, who once impeached him.  Both were assigned to compile records related to King Seongjong's reign for Annals of Joseon Dynasty, and  Kim Il-son, a disciple of Kim Jong-jik, included the latter's writing that was critical of King Sejo's usurpation in the compilation.  (Kim Jong-jik wrote a lamentation of Xiang Yu's murder of Emperor Yi of Chu in early Chinese history after he heard of Danjong's death at the order of King Sejo.)  When Yi Guk-don, Kim Il-son's superior, found this out, he sensed a chance of revenge.  Kim Il-son and other followers of Kim Jong-jik were accused of treason by the Hungu faction, many of whom originally gained power from their support of Sejo. Because Yeonsangun's lineage came from Sejo, Sarim faction's view of Sejo's usurpation was considered to be treasonable.  Yeonsangun - who disliked academia and was notorious for turning the Seonggyungwan, royal study hall, into his personal brothel - found an opportunity to purge the Sarim scholars and weaken Three Offices.  Kim Il-son and two others (Kwon Obok and Kwon Kyungyoo) received death sentence by Lingchi while three were beheaded. https://sillok.history.go.kr/id/kja_10407026_004 Kim Jong-jik's remains were excavated and then beheaded, and at least 18 others were exiled.  Yeonsangun ordered the entire court officials to watch Kim's execution and even ordered that those who did not attend or turned face away be reported so that they might be punished.

Second literati purge of 1504 
The Second Literati Purge of 1504, or Gapja Sahwa (갑자사화, 甲子士禍), followed when Yeonsangun eventually discovered that his real mother was not Queen Jung-hyeon but Deposed Queen Yun, who had been executed (by poison) in 1482 for poisoning one of Seongjong's concubines and scratching Seongjong's face. Yeonsangun was told about his mother's death and presented with a piece of clothing purportedly stained with her vomited blood. He responded by killing two of Seongjong's concubines, and ordering the execution of officials who had supported Yun's death. This event struck both the Hungu and the remnants of Sarim factions indiscriminately, including the instigators of the first purge. At least 36 officials were executed (by drinking poison) and the remains of eight deceased officials were mutilated. The actual death toll was much greater than 36, because the victims' families and relatives were punished as well - male members being killed and the female members enslaved. A total of 239 officials were either executed, exiled, or dismissed. Yeonsangun was eventually deposed by the remaining Hungu officials, and his half-brother Jungjong became the eleventh king of Joseon in 1506.

Third literati purge of 1519

The Third Literati Purge of 1519, also called Kimyo Sahwa or Gimyo Sahwa (기묘사화, 己卯士禍), is one of the most discussed literati purges in Joseon Dynasty because the Sarim faction held political power and was in the process of carrying out significant reforms at the time of their purge.

Jungjong worked to remove excesses of Yeonsangun and return to Seongjong's era, but his royal authority was limited due to powerful presence of coup leaders who put him on the throne.  Only when the three main leaders of coup died of old age and natural causes eight years later, Jungjong began to assert his authority and look for ways to restrain Hungu faction's power.  He soon found an answer in Jo Gwang-jo, a young and energetic leader of the Sarim faction, who soon became Jungjong's most trusted official. He enjoyed such a complete confidence of Jungjong that Jungjong abandoned a planned war at the sole opposition by Jo. With Jungjong's support, Jo rose to become an Inspector General only four years after entering politics in a series of unprecedented promotions and brought in many like-minded, young Sarim scholars from rural provinces to Jungjong's court. Under his leadership, the Sarim faction pushed forth a series of reforms as they established local self-government system called Hyang'yak, pursued land reforms to distribute land more equally and limit amount of land owned by the rich, promulgated Confucian beliefs widely among the public with vernacular translations, and sought to reduce the number of slaves. Jo believed that any talented people including slaves should be appointed as officials regardless of social status. (For instance, he met a nameless butcher/tanner of lowest class and admired his learning so much that he discussed state affairs with him and wanted to appoint him as a government official.)  According to Annals of the Joseon Dynasty, no official dared to receive a bribe or exploit the populace or local provinces during this time because of strict enforcement by Inspector General's Office.  He was admired so much by populace that when he appeared on streets people gathered before him saying, "Our master is coming," according to famous Korean philosopher Yi I.

However, these radical reforms generated fierce hostility and resistance of the Hungu faction. Jo also made many political enemies by impeaching many of the so-called heroes of 1506 coup.  Especially when Jo argued that many of the alleged contributors to 1506 coup did not actually contribute to the coup and revoked their special privileges (including tax exemptions and huge stipends), the Hungu faction began to plot Jo's downfall. In early 1519, there was a plot by some Hungu officials to assassinate Sarim officials, which was discovered in time.

"Jo will become king"
Jo's uncompromising character and his frequent remonstrations to Jungjong to support his radical programs also began to irritate the king.  Furthermore, Consort Gyeong of Park clan and Consort Hui of Hong clan (Hungu faction leader Hong Kyung-ju's daughter) sought to estrange Jungjong and Jo Gwang-jo by often questioning Jo's loyalty and claiming that popular support was shifting to Jo. At the behest of Hong Kyung-ju, Minister of Rites Nam Gon, and Shim Jung, and other Hungu leaders, they told Jungjong that people were saying that it was actually Jo Gwang-jo who ruled the country and that people wanted to make him their king. Even if Jo was not disloyal, he would not be able to stop his supporters from doing so, they said.

According to Annals of Joseon Dynasty, Nam Gon now set out to slander Jo and wrote a phrase "Ju cho will become the king" (주초위왕, 走肖爲王)" with honey or sugary water on mulberry leaves so that caterpillars left behind such phrase on leaves. When two Hanja (Chinese) characters "ju"(走) and "cho"(肖) are put together, they form a new Hanja character "jo"(趙), which happens to be Jo Gwang-jo's family name. Consort Hong or Consort Park showed the leaf to Jungjong and claimed that this was the heaven's warning that Jo would take the throne himself after eliminating Hungu faction. Jungjong, who himself rose to the throne through a coup d'état, began to distrust Jo Gwang-jo. [When Goryeo dynasty fell and was replaced by Joseon dynasty, there was popular saying "Son of wood will gain the country" (목자득국 木子得國). When two Hanja characters meaning wood(木) and son(子) are combined, they form a new character "yi"(李), which happens to be the family name of Yi Seong-gye, who deposed the last king of Goryeo and founded Joseon dynasty.  These phrases helped Yi Seong-gye win popular support for the new dynasty as heaven's will.]

Now feeling certain that Jungjong was sufficiently estranged from Jo, Hong Kyung-ju secretly entered the palace to warn King Jungjong that the court was filled with Jo's supporters and that no one could dare oppose him openly. When Jo petitioned Jungjong to revoke special privileges of people who falsely contributed to 1506 coup, Jungjong's suspicion was further heightened.  Jungjong dispatched a secret letter to Hong Kyung-ju, expressing his fear that Jo Gwang-jo would next go on to question legitimacy of the coup and then turn against him. Jungjong instructed Hungu leaders to kill Jo Gwang-jo and then inform him. On November 15, 1519, Hungu leaders entered the palace secretly at night to bypass Royal Secretariat and present to the king written charges against Jo: he and his supporters deceived the king and put the state in disorder by forming a clique and abusing their positions to promote their supporters while excluding their opponents. Inspector Jo Gwang-jo, Justice Minister Kim Jung, and six others were immediately arrested, and they were about to be killed extrajudicially without trial or even investigation. The whole event had appearance of coup d'état except that it was sanctioned by the king.

"What is their crime?"
They would have been immediately killed except that War Minister Yi Jang-gon, who arrested Sarim officials, entreated that ministers should be consulted for such decision. The cabinet meeting on the following day regarding Jo's fate is described in detail in the Annals of the Joseon Dynasty.  Most officials expressed their shock at Jo Gwang-jo's arrest and Jungjong's intention to execute him.  They entreated that he may have been extreme in his youthful zeal to improve the country but could not possibly have private agenda. Chief State Councillor Jeong Gwang-pil, who often clashed with Jo and was even approached by Nam Gon for support, entreated in tears: "I have frequently witnessed horrid calamities during the reign of deposed king (Yeonsangun), but how could I imagine to see such thing again even after meeting the wise king?" Chief Council and Six Ministries jointly entreated that punishing Jo and others on such charge without evidence would be a blot on the king's reputation. Eighteen younger officials requested to the king to imprison them with Jo Gwang-jo.  Even Hong Sook, who became Justice Minister overnight and interrogated Jo, reported to the king that he was "deeply moved" by Jo's loyalty.

New Inspector General Yu Eun protested in even stronger terms: "If Jo Gwang-jo is guilty of crime, he should be punished in open and just manner ... Instead, Your Majesty is handing out such punishment after secret words by two people in the middle of night... What is so difficult about punishing few seonbis with authority of king that Your Majesty should do so secretly by sending a secret message?... If there is a crime, it should be dealt with clearly and justly, but Your Majesty appeared to trust and be friendly with your subjects on the outside while thinking of eliminating them in mind." Meanwhile, 150 Seonggyungwan students stormed the palace to protest Jo's arrest and filled the palace with shouts of entreaties,  and later 240 students petitioned to claim Jo's innocence and requested to be imprisoned together.  Such outpouring in Jo's support may have increased Jungjong's suspicion and anger.  Later Chief State Councillor Jeong, Deputy State Councillor Ahn Dang and even War Minister Yi Jang-gon were removed from office for opposing Jo's execution.

Purge of Sarim scholars
Jo Gwang-jo was completely caught off guard by the turn of the event.  The Sarim faction had scored its biggest victory just four days earlier when Jungjong granted their petition to revoke special status for 70 Hungu officials. He continued to believe that Jungjong was misled by wicked Hungu ministers and was confident that he could persuade the king of his loyalty once he could face him in the interrogation.  He wrote to Jungjong of his fear of this incident becoming a bloody purge and entreated that he would not regret dying ten thousand times if only he could be granted an audience.  However, he would never have a chance to see Jungjong again.  Amid petitions for leniency, Jungjong commuted the death sentence to exile, and Jo Gwang-jo was exiled to Neung-ju. But less than a month later, Jungjong fired many ministers who entreated on Jo's behalf and reinstated Jo's death sentence by poison.  Before drinking poison, Jo wrote a death poem declaring his loyalty and bowed four times toward the palace.  Later when there was a severe drought in the country, people believed that it was heaven's punishment for killing an innocent seonbi.

Kim Jung and three others were executed as well in 1520, and dozens of Sarim scholars were exiled. Many others left the central government in protest and retreated to rural provinces. In 1521, Ahn Dang's son allegedly plotted to assassinate Nam Gon and Shim Jung, for which a dozen people including Ahn Dang were executed. In all, 225 officials were affected by the purge. Most of Jo's reforms were rescinded with his fall. 
In the end, Jungjong abruptly abandoned his reformist agenda because he either lost confidence in Jo Gwango-jo's programs or feared that he would become too powerful in the future. While Jungjong and Jo Gwang-jo shared the reformist agenda, Jungjong was also chiefly interested in solidifying royal authority whereas the latter was more concerned with neo-Confucian ideology, in which the king must be governed and restricted by teachings of Confucius and Mencius.

The Third Literati Purge of 1519 was widely viewed as a missed opportunity to fulfill ideal neo-Confucian society by later generations because Joseon politics soon degenerated into power struggle among in-laws and relatives of the royal family.  Later its victims, called Gimyo Sarim or "Wise men of Gimyo," were venerated as Confucian martyrs while instigators became symbols of wickedness for many generations (For instance, fermented fish of lowest quality is still called Gonjangyi, combined word from Nam Gon and Shim Jung's given names).  Nam Gon, one of main instigators who fabricated the conspiracy, regretted his role in the purge late in his life and willed that all his writings be burnt.  No writing of his remains except for one short poem although he was a famous writer.

Fourth literati purge of 1545
When Jungjong died in 1544 and the crown prince Injong became the twelfth king, Sarim's hopes proved to be true.  He appointed Yi Eonjeok and other famous Sarim scholars to high positions and rehabilitated Jo Gwang-jo and other purge victims.  Unfortunately for the Sarim faction, Injong's reign was also to be the shortest of Joseon kings. When Injong died eight months later and Myeongjong became the thirteenth king of Joseon at the age of twelve, his mother Queen Munjeong became the regent and her brother Yoon Won Hyung wielded enormous power.  (Many in the Sarim faction believed that Injong was poisoned by Queen Munjeong, but there is no evidence that this was the case.)  Lesser Yoon faction was not persecuted by Greater Yoon faction during Injong's reign, but Injong dismissed Yoon Won-hyung and Yoon Won-ro from their positions after they were impeached by the Greater Yoon faction. Now that he was reinstated, Yoon Wong-hyung accused Yoon Im and his supporters of plotting to put another prince instead of Myeongjong on the throne after Injong's death.  This ploy at first backfired and led to his exile, but continued accusations and rumors of Yoon Im's treason led to the Fourth Literati Purge of 1545, in which the prince, Yoon Im, and nine of his supporters including Sarim scholars were executed.  After this initial purge, Yoon Won-hyung continued to purge his rivals and Sarim scholars over next five years until the total death toll surpassed one hundred and many others including Yi Eonjeok were exiled.  Yoon Won-hyung even killed his older brother Yoon Won-ro in the ensuing power struggle. After Queen Munjeong's death in 1565, Myeongjong exiled Yoon Won-hyung, who died or committed suicide the same year, and attempted to govern well by recruiting talented people but died two years later.  Along with Kim Anro, Yoon Won-hyung is considered one of the worst politicians of Joseon dynasty.

Power struggle of in-laws
Unlike other literati purges, the Fourth Literati Purge of 1545, or Ulsa Sahwa (을사사화, 乙巳士禍), was largely a result of power struggle between relatives of the competing princes.  After Jo Gwang-jo's fall, Nam Gon and Shim Jung's faction and Kim Anro's faction vied for power after Kim Anro's son married Jungjong's eldest daughter. Kim Anro was exiled by Nam Gon and Shim Jung for abusing power, but he returned from exile after Nam Gon's death and successfully drove out Shim Jung, who was accused of accepting bribes from Consort Park to help her put her son on the throne instead of crown prince. Later he framed Shim Jung and Consort Park on the charge of cursing the crown prince (A dead rat whose mouth, eyes, and ears were burnt with hot iron to make it look like a pig was discovered hanging from a tree in the crown prince's palace on his birthday. There also phrases cursing the crown prince, whose Chinese zodiac sign was Pig. Consort Park was suspected for she was already known to be plotting to put her son on the throne instead.  It was later found out to be Kim Anro's doing after his fall.)  Consort Park, her son Prince Buksong, and Shim Jung were executed. Kim Anro now unleashed the reign of terror against his political enemies in the name of protecting the crown prince. He even attempted to depose Queen Munjeong, who gave birth to a son who was later to become Myeongjong, but this led to his downfall and execution in 1537.

After Kim Anro's fall, the crown prince Injong's maternal uncle Yoon Im and Queen Munjeong's brothers Yoon Won-ro and Yoon Won-hyung filled the power vacuum. (Yoon Im and Yoon Brothers were close relatives by that period's standards - Yoon Im's great-grandfather was older brother of Yoon Brothers' great-great-grandfather.)  Many officials gathered around the two centers of power and developed into separate political factions. Yoon Im's faction became known as ‘Greater Yoon’ and the Yoon brothers' faction as ‘Lesser Yoon.’  By then, Jungjong promoted Sarim scholars again by recalling them from exile and reappointing to court positions to restrain Hungu faction's power.  Many Sarim scholars joined the Greater Yoon since they had great hopes for the crown prince, who studied under Jo Gwang-jo and Yi Hwang and was greatly anticipated to become a benevolent ruler.

Aftermath
These four purges decimated the Sarim faction and again drove them to the rural villages, where they built schools (called seowon).  Yi Hwang, for example, left politics in the aftermath of the Fourth Literati Purge and did not return to the court despite repeated summons by Myeongjong. Other famous philosophers Jo Shik, Seo Gyeong-deok, and Seoung Soo-chim also turned away from politics after Jo Gwang-jo's death. Jo Shik turned down his appointment by writing to Myeongjong: "Under Your Majesty's reign, state of affairs has already gone awry and the foundation of the country has already collapsed.  Heaven's will has already left as did the support of people... The Queen Regent is thoughtful, but she is merely a widow deep inside palace, and Your Majesty is young and thus merely a lonely heir to the late king.  Therefore, how would one handle thousands of natural disasters and billion pieces of people's heart?" (In Joseon Dynasty, natural disasters were thought to occur due to king's fault.)

However, the Sarim continued to thrive in rural provinces through its seowons and Hyang'yak system.  By the reign of King Seonjo, successor to Myeongjong, the Sarim faction gained the control of the central government and dominated Joseon politics ever since.

Modern reinterpretation
The above account of literati purges is based on widely accepted traditional understanding of the subject, which largely stems from the Sarim faction's point of view.  The Annals of the Joseon Dynasty and much of what we know about these events were largely written by Sarim scholars even before they emerged as the eventual victor.  Some historians have tried to reinterpret the literati purges as a result of struggle between the Joseon kings who wanted to establish absolute monarchy and the aristocrats who claimed that the true loyalty to king was to guide him to become a benevolent Confucian philosopher-king by pointing out his mistakes if necessary.  The Sarim scholars tended to occupy key positions in Three Offices, which put them in conflict with the king and high-ranking ministers.  In this view, the distinction between Sarim and Hungu factions are thought to be largely artificial, and division within aristocracy was largely along the family connections rather than philosophical differences.

Other purges
Following the Fourth Literati Purge of 1545, there were a series of other similar purges out of political struggle between different factions, but they are not called "literati purges," or sahwa (사화) in Korean, which specifically refers to persecution of Sarim scholars by the Hungu faction in late 15th and early 16th century.  The later purges are instead called with various names such as oksa (meaning treason case), muok(false treason case), hwanguk (change of power), and bakhae (persecution, especially of those Catholic faith in the 19th century).   One notable example of the later purges is Treason Case of 1589, or Gichuk Oksa, which is sometimes called the fifth literati purge even though both the instigators and victims were of Sarim faction.  In these later purges, the victimized faction would call the event "literati purge (sahwa)" to signify their innocence and the rival faction's wrongs.

Oksa (Treason Case)
Shinsa Muok (신사무옥) or False Treason Case of 1521 - Three years after the Third Literati Purge of 1519, Jo Gwang-jo's supporters were accused of plotting to assassinate Nam Gon and Shim Jeong and were executed. It is more often considered a part of Third Literati Purge (Jungjong).
Gichuk Oksa (기축옥사) or Treason Case of 1589 - the bloodiest purge in Joseon history, in which the Western faction purged the rival Eastern faction. 1,000 people were executed or exiled (Seonjo).
Gyechuk Oksa (계축옥사) or Treason Case of 1613 - After Gwanghaegun rose to the throne, Greater Northern faction accused Lesser Northern faction of plotting to dethrone Gwanghaegun and make his half-brother the king.  (The excesses of Greater Northern faction led to the coup d'état in which the Westerners and Southerners placed Injo on the throne.)
Shinyim Oksa (신임옥사) or Treason Cases of 1721 and 1722 - Leaders of Noron faction (split from Western faction) who supported Yeonyingun (later Yeongjo) advocated regency of Yeoningun in place of sickly Gyeongjong.  They were accused of disloyalty, and four of them were executed in 1721.  In 1722, Soron and Namin factions accused Noron faction of plotting to kill Gyeongjong, and eight leaders who had again advocated Yeonyingun's regency were executed.
Eulhae Oksa (을해옥사) or Treason Case of 1755 - After Yeonyingun rose to the throne and became Yeongjo, Soron faction was driven out of power in reaction to Shinyim Oksa.  Five Soron members were accused of treason and were executed.
Hwanguk (Turn of state) - Purges in Sukjong's reign is called hwanguk, meaning sudden change of government.  They marked the reemergence of earlier purges after a century of peaceful rivalry between Southern and Western factions.
Gyeonshin Hwanguk (경신환국) or Turn of 1680 - Two leaders of Southern faction was accused of plotting to dethrone Sukjong by the Western faction (Sukjong).
Gisa Hwanguk (기사환국) or Turn of 1689 - The Western faction fell out of power after opposing the naming of crown prince. Song Siyeol and others were executed. (Sukjong)
Gaapsul Hwanguk (갑술환국) or Turn of 1694 - The Southern faction's attempt to purge Western faction on charge of plotting to reinstate deposed Queen Inhyeon backfires.  The Southern faction would never recover from this purge politically.  However, the Westerners already split into Noron and Soron factions. (Sukjong)
Shinchuk Hwanguk (신축환국) or Turn of 1721 - Noron faction loses power in the aftermath of Shinyim Oksa. (Gyeongjong)
Eulsa Hwanguk (을사환국) or Turn of 1725 - Yeongjo becomes the king, and Noron faction regains power.
Jeongmi Hwanguk (정미환국) or Turn of 1727 - Yeongjo replaces hardliners with moderates from both Noron and Soron faction.
Bakhae (Persecution) - They were also called Saok(사옥), meaning "Heresy Case".
Sinhae Bakhae (신해박해) or Persecution of 1781 - First persecution of Catholicism in Korea.  Noron's Byeokpa faction advocated persecution while Shipa faction opposed it.  Two Catholics were executed, but persecution was limited after Jeongjo adopted Shipa faction's policy.
Shinyu Bakhae (신유박해) or Persecution of 1801 - After Jeongjo's death, Queen Jeongsun and conservative Byoekpa faction reversed many of Jeongjo's reforms and carried out the worst persecution of the Joseon Catholics, which was also aimed at the purge of liberal Shipa and Southern factions, some of whose leaders including Jeong Yak-yong were Catholics or had Catholic relatives.  300 people were executed, and Jeong Yak-yong was exiled. (Sunjo)
Gihae Bakhae (기해박해) or Persecution of 1839 - There was no persecution while Shipa was in power, but Byeoka regained power and resumed the persecution of Catholics by executing 119 people. (Heonjong)

Depictions in Korean mass media
The Korean literati purges are frequently depicted in Korean television dramas and movies.  In Dae Jang Geum, main protagonist Jang Guem's father is a victim of the second literati purge.  Jang Geum herself and her mentor Lady Han are framed in connection with the third literati purge while the male protagonist Min Jung Ho is portrayed as a follower of Jo Gwang-jo. In television drama Immortal Admiral Yi Sun-sin (2004-5), Yi Sun-shin's grandfather is depicted as a victim of third literati purge and Yi's father is arrested while paying respect to Jo Gwang-jo's spirit at Jo's abandoned house.  the second literati purge is dramatized through the movie, "The Treacherous" (2015). The third and fourth literati purges also constitute main plot lines of the 2001 television drama "Ladies of the Palace".  The first and second literati purges are depicted in television dramas "King and Queen" (1998–2000) "The King and I" (2007–2008), "Queen Insoo " (2011) " and 2005 film The King and the Clown.

References

Sources

 Republication of a 1959 thesis

 

Joseon dynasty
15th century in Korea
16th century in Korea
Political repression
Political and cultural purges